Nyle Godsmark (born 10 April 1992 in Rutherglen) is a Scottish rugby union player who plays for the Scotland 7s on the World Rugby Sevens Series.

A Scotland 7s international, he previously joined the then Pro12 champions Glasgow Warriors on a short-term deal to provide cover for the Rugby World Cup.

He previously played for amateur side Edinburgh Academicals.

References

Scotland 7s}

1993 births
Living people
Rugby union players from Rutherglen
Scottish rugby union players
Glasgow Warriors players
Scotland Club XV international rugby union players
Rugby union wings